The 2007-08 Turkey Cup 2007–08 was the 46th edition of the annual tournament that determined the association football Süper Lig Turkish Cup champion under the auspices of the Turkish Football Federation (TFF). Kayserispor won in the final. This tournament was conducted under the UEFA Cup system having replaced at the 44th edition a standard knockout competition scheme. The results of the tournament also determined which clubs would be promoted or relegated.

First qualifying round

|}

Second qualifying round

|}

Group stage

Group A

Group B

Group C

Group D

Quarter-finals

|}

Semi-finals

|}

Final

References

2007-08
Cup
2007–08 domestic association football cups